|}

The Eclipse Stakes is a Group 1 flat horse race in Great Britain open to horses aged three years or older. It is run at Sandown Park over a distance of 1 mile, 1 furlong and 209 yards (2,002 metres), and it is scheduled to take place each year in early July.

History
The event is named after Eclipse, a celebrated 18th-century racehorse. It was established in 1886, and the inaugural running was won by Bendigo. At that time, it was Britain's richest ever race. The prize fund of £10,000 was donated by Leopold de Rothschild at the request of General Owen Williams, a co-founder of Sandown Park.

The Eclipse Stakes was contested by high-quality fields from its inception. It was won by Ayrshire, the previous year's Derby winner, in 1889. The first three finishers in 1903 — Ard Patrick, Sceptre and Rock Sand — had won seven Classics between them.

The race has been sponsored by Coral since 1976, and it is now familiarly known as the "Coral-Eclipse". The most recent Classic winner to achieve victory was Vadeni, the Prix du Jockey Club winner, in 2022.

Records
Most successful horse (2 wins):
 Orme – 1892, 1893
 Buchan – 1919, 1920
 Polyphontes – 1924, 1925
 Mtoto – 1987, 1988
 Halling – 1995, 1996

Leading jockey (7 wins):
 Lester Piggott – Mystery IX (1951), Darius (1955), Arctic Explorer (1957), St Paddy (1961), Pieces of Eight (1966), Wolver Hollow (1969), Artaius (1977)

Leading trainer (6 wins):
 Alec Taylor, Jr. – Bayardo (1909), Lemberg (1910, dead-heat), Buchan (1919, 1920), Craig an Eran (1921), Saltash (1923)
 Sir Michael Stoute - Opera House (1993), Ezzoud (1994), Pilsudski (1996), Medicean (2001), Notnowcato (2007), Ulysses (2017)
 Aidan O'Brien - Giant's Causeway (2000), Hawk Wing (2002), Oratorio (2005), Mount Nelson (2008), So You Think (2011), St Mark's Basilica (2021)

Leading owner (6 wins): (includes part ownership)
 Godolphin - Halling (1995, 1996), Daylami (1998), Refuse to Bend (2004), Hawkbill (2016), Ghaiyyath (2020)
 Sue Magnier – Giant's Causeway (2000), Hawk Wing (2002), Oratorio (2005), Mount Nelson (2008), So You Think (2011), St Mark's Basilica (2021)

Winners
The race was not run from 1915-1918 because of World War I and from 1940-1945 because of World War II.

See also
 Horse racing in Great Britain
 List of British flat horse races

References
 Racing Post:

 galopp-sieger.de – Eclipse Stakes.
 ifhaonline.org – International Federation of Horseracing Authorities – Eclipse Stakes (2019).
 pedigreequery.com – Eclipse Stakes – Sandown Park.
 tbheritage.com – Eclipse Stakes.
 
 
 Race Recordings 

Specific

Flat races in Great Britain
Sandown Park Racecourse
Open middle distance horse races
Recurring sporting events established in 1886
British Champions Series
1886 establishments in England